Estus Washington Pirkle (March 12, 1930 – March 3, 2005) was an American Baptist minister, evangelist, and filmmaker.

Early life 
Estus Washington Pirkle was born in Vienna, Georgia on March 12, 1930. He was one of ten children to Grover Washington Pirkle and Bessie Nora Jones. He grew up primarily in Sycamore, Georgia. He graduated from Norman Junior College and attended Mercer University in Macon and Southwestern Baptist Theological Seminary in Fort Worth, Texas. Pirkle became a pastor travelling through the southern United States, including his home state of Georgia, Texas, Louisiana and Kentucky. He met his wife Ann in Athens, Texas. Pirkle served at Locust Grove Baptist Church in New Albany, Mississippi for 36 years.

Film work
In addition to his preaching, Pirkle was known for creating and starring in his own Christian films as well as writing numerous books. His films were directed by Ron Ormond (known for his previous works on exploitation films like 1953's Mesa of Lost Women) and produced by the Ormond Organization of Nashville, Tennessee. The first of these films was If Footmen Tire You, What Will Horses Do? from 1971.

The Burning Hell
The Burning Hell is a 1974 film created by Pirkle (directed by Ormond) as his interpretation of what the Bible has to say about hell.

The Believer's Heaven
The 1977 companion movie The Believer's Heaven gives Pirkle's interpretation of what the Bible has to say about heaven.

Legacy
Pirkle's preaching was sampled by Negativland for the song "Christianity Is Stupid".

Filmmaker Nicolas Winding Refn restored both The Burning Hell and The Believer's Heaven each for film festival showings and free streaming.

Bibliography

 (1968) Wintertime, Moffitt Press
 (1969) Preachers in Space, Hiott Press
 (1969) What Are You Living For?, MP Religious Book and Record Co.
 The 1611 King James Bible: a study, The King's Press
 A Ray for God, The Official Biography of Percy Ray, The King's Press

Filmography

If Footmen Tire You, What Will Horses Do? (1971)
The Burning Hell (1974)
The Believer's Heaven (1977)

References

External links

The Burning Hell at byNWR
If Footmen Tire You, What Will Horses Do? at byNWR

1930 births
2005 deaths
American evangelicals
Christian writers
American filmmakers
People from New Albany, Mississippi